This is a list of election results for the electoral district of Tea Tree Gully in South Australian elections.

Members for Tea Tree Gully

Election results

Elections in the 1970s

References

South Australian state electoral results by district